Michel Jean Roger Edouard Fermaud (6 September 1921 – 7 June 2007) was a French author, dialoguist, film director, and screenwriter.

Filmography (selection) 
 1960 , co director with Jacques Poitrenaud
 1977 L'Homme qui aimait les femmes  by François Truffaut (co screenwriter)
 1983 The Man Who Loved Women by Blake Edwards, original script
 1983 , (director)

References

External links 
 

20th-century French screenwriters
Mass media people from Bordeaux
1921 births
2007 deaths